Skrr may refer to:

 "Skrr" (Yxng Bane song)
 "Skrr" (Kalim and Ufo361 song)